Arivumani is a 2004 Indian Tamil-language drama film directed by M. A. Kennedy. The film stars Murali and Meera Vasudevan.

Plot
A carefree youth Arivumani (Murali) loses his wife in an accident. Later, he finds a child 'Ice Kutti' and takes care of her, what all he went through and how he solved the child's issues forms the rest of the story.

Cast
Murali
Meera Vasudevan
 Shreesha
 Shabnam
Ramesh Khanna
Devan
Manikka Vinayagam
Pandu
Ajay Rathnam
Balu Anand
T. P. Gajendran

Soundtrack

The music was composed by Janakiraj and released on Ayngaran.

References

2004 films
2000s Tamil-language films